The Nashville Sound is the sixth studio album by Jason Isbell and the third credited with the 400 Unit. It was produced by Dave Cobb, who also produced Isbell's previous two records: 2013's Southeastern and 2015's Something More Than Free. The album was released on June 16, 2017. The Nashville Sound again features Isbell's band The 400 Unit and is the first album since 2011's Here We Rest to give the band top billing alongside him.

Reception

The album earned Isbell his first CMA Award nomination. It was nominated for Album of the Year at the 2017 ceremony. It won Best Americana Album at the 2018 Grammy Awards and International Album of the Year at the 2018 UK Americana Awards. Additionally, "If We Were Vampires" won the Grammy for Best American Roots Song.

Accolades

Commercial performance
The Nashville Sound debuted at number four on the US Billboard 200 with 54,000 album-equivalent units, of which 51,000 were pure album sales. It is Isbell's highest chart placement on that chart, having previously peaked at number six with Something More Than Free (2015). The album has sold 152,500 copies in the US as of December 2018.

The single 'If We Were Vampires' peaked at No. 29 on the Billboard Triple A chart

Track listing

Personnel
Credits adapted from AllMusic.

The 400 Unit
Jason Isbell – lead vocals, harmony vocals, acoustic guitar, electric guitar
Derry Deborja – keyboard, Therevox, photography 
Chad Gamble – drums
Jimbo Hart – bass
Amanda Shires – harmony vocals, fiddle, photography 
Sadler Vaden – electric guitar

Production and design
Danny Clinch – photography
Dave Cobb – producer, acoustic guitar, percussion
Gena Johnson – assistant engineer
Peter Lyman – mastering
Matt Ross-Spang – engineer
Tracie Thomas – art direction

Charts

Weekly charts

Year-end charts

References

2017 albums
Jason Isbell albums
Albums produced by Dave Cobb
Grammy Award for Best Americana Album